World History was a compilation album by Christian rock band Mad at the World. It highlighted songs from their first six studio albums. It did not include any songs from their 1995 album (The Dreamland Café).

History

In 1998, KMG Records released World History, a collection of songs from the first six albums, but not The Dreamland Café. It "downplayed the heavy guitars" and "brought to the forefront the picturesque vocal flair of Roger Rose." In the liner notes it states: "The unifying thread is the Rose brothers' great writing, vocals, arrangements and spiritual challenges to take control of your life by following God's plan." Writing for Phantom Tollbooth, Sam Hagadorn listed it as one of his ten best albums of 1998.

Both the Phantom Tollbooth and HM Magazine have referenced the disc as having re-recorded songs, but this is denied on the band's website.

Track listing
All songs written by Roger Rose except "Marshmallow Land" written by Randy Rose
 "That Lonesome Road" - 4:30 (Through the Forest)
 "It's Not a Joke" - 3:29 (Seasons of Love)
 "Fearfully and Wonderfully" - 3:51 (Flowers in the Rain)
 "Dry Your Tears" - 4:14 (Mad at the World)
 "Not the Same" - 3:36 (The Ferris Wheel)
 "Back to You" - 3:22 (Boomerang)
 "This Lie" - 3:32 (Flowers in the Rain)
 "Living Dead" - 3:30 (Mad at the World)
 "Marshmallow Land" - 2:59 (Seasons of Love)
 "I've Got a Heaven" - 4:27 (Through The Forest)
 "No More Innocence" - 5:01 (Mad at the World)
 "Eyes of Heaven" - 3:15 (The Ferris Wheel)
 "Ballad of Adam and Eve" - 3:34 (Boomerang)
 "In My Dream" - 3:56 (Flowers in the Rain)

Personnel
Roger Rose - Vocals, guitars, keyboards, piano, drum programming and drums
Randy Rose - Vocals, guitar and drums
Mike Pendleton - Guitar, bass
Brent Gordon - Lead and rhythm guitar
Mike Link - Bass
Ben Jacobs - Lead and rhythm guitar

From The Liner Notes
"Few Christian bands have enjoyed the longevity and underground acclaim as (sic) Mad at the World. From the day mailman and lead singer Roger Rose stuck a tape in a record company executive's mailbox until current times, Mad at the World has turned heads with their provocative music.

Their progression from keyboard driven angst to "wall of guitar" social awareness is captured in this collection. The unifying thread is the Rose brothers' great writing, vocals, arrangements and spiritual challenges to take control of your life by following God's eternal plan. Sit back and enjoy this (six) album retrospective of Mad at the World's history."

References

1998 compilation albums
Mad at the World albums
Christian rock compilation albums